Myoporum rimatarense  was a plant in the figwort family, Scrophulariaceae and was endemic to Rimatara Island in French Polynesia. It is only known from the type specimen collected in 1921 and 1934 and was declared extinct in 2021 by the IUCN Red List.

Description

The size, shape and colour of the petals and stamens is not known. The fruit is a more or less spherical drupe.

Taxonomy
Myoporum rimatarense was first formally described in 1935 by Forest B. H. Brown and the description was published in Bernice P. Bishop Museum Bulletin. The specific epithet  rimatarense refers to the name of the island where the type specimen was collected by A.M.Stokes.

Distribution and habitat
Myoporum rimatarense was only found on Rimatara Island. The type specimen was collected on a sandy beach near the village of Amaru.

Conservation
An extensive search in 2004 failed to find a single specimen and the species is now presumed extinct.

References

rimatarense
Extinct flora of Oceania
Flora of French Polynesia
Plants described in 1935
Taxonomy articles created by Polbot
Taxa named by Forest B.H. Brown